is a subway station on the  Fukuoka City Subway Nanakuma Line in Jōnan-ku, Fukuoka in Japan. Its station symbol is a picture of seven hexagon in violet.

Lines 
Fukuoka City Subway
Nanakuma Line

Platforms

History
February 3, 2005: Opening of the station

References

Railway stations in Japan opened in 2005
Railway stations in Fukuoka Prefecture
Nanakuma Line